Miss Russia 2012, the 20th national beauty pageant of Russia, was held in a concert hall Barvikha Luxury Village in Moscow on 3 March 2012. 50 contestants from all over the Russia competed for the crown. Natalia Gantimurova of Moscow crowned her successor Elizaveta Golovanova of Smolensk, at the end of the event. Leila Lopes and Ivian Sarcos participated in the event.

Results

Final Placements

Contestants

References

External links
 Miss Russia Official Website

Miss Russia
2012 beauty pageants
2012 in Moscow